I-63 was an Imperial Japanese Navy  cruiser submarine of the KD3B sub-class commissioned in 1928. She was sunk in an accidental collision with her sister ship  with the loss of most of her crew in early 1939. The wreck was salvaged in 1940 and scrapped.

Design and description
The submarines of the KD3B sub-class were essentially repeats of the preceding KD3A sub-class with minor modifications to improve seakeeping. They displaced  surfaced and  submerged.

For surface running, the boats were powered by two  diesel engines, each driving one propeller shaft. When submerged each propeller was driven by a  electric motor. They could reach  on the surface and  underwater.

The boats were armed with eight internal  torpedo tubes, six in the bow and two in the stern. They carried one reload for each tube; a total of 16 torpedoes. They were also armed with one  deck gun.

Construction and commissioning
I-63 was built by the Sasebo Naval Arsenal at Sasebo, Japan. Her keel was laid on 12 August 1926 and she was launched on 28 September 1927. She was completed and commissioned on 20 December 1928.

Service history

1928–1938
Upon commissioning, I-63 was assigned to Submarine Division 28, in which she spent her entire career. The division was assigned to the Sasebo Naval District on 24 December 1929, then was reassigned to Submarine Squadron 2 in the 2nd Fleet in the Combined Fleet on 1 December 1930, to Submarine Squadron 1 in the 1st Fleet in the Combined Fleet on 1 December 1932, and to the Sasebo Defense Division in the Sasebo Naval District on 15 November 1933. On 20 March 1934, I-63 was decommissioned and placed in reserve, and while she was in reserve Submarine Division 28 was reassigned to the Sasebo Guard Squadron on 11 December 1933.

Submarine Division 28 again was assigned to Submarine Squadron 2 in the 2nd Fleet on 15 November 1934, and I-63 was recommissioned that day.  On 7 February 1935 I-63 got underway from Sasebo along with the other five submarines of Submarine Squadron 2 — I-53, I-54 and I-55 of Submarine Division 18 and Submarine Division 28′s I-59 and  — for a training cruise in the Kuril Islands. The cruise concluded with their arrival at Sukumo Bay on 25 February 1935. The six submarines got back underway from Sasebo on 29 March 1935 for a training cruise in Chinese waters and returned to Sasebo on 4 April 1935. On 15 November 1935, Submarine Division 28 again was assigned to Submarine Squadron 1 in the 1st Fleet.

On 27 March 1937, I-63 put to sea from Sasebo with I-59 and I-60 for a training cruise in the vicinity of Tsingtao, China. The three submarines concluded it with their arrival at Ariake Bay on 6 April 1937. Submarine Division 28 was reassigned to the Sasebo Defense Squadron in the Sasebo Naval District on 1 December 1937 and then to Submarine Squadron 1 in the 1st Fleet on 15 December 1938.

Loss
In January 1939, I-63 and the other submarines of Submarine Squadron 1 got underway for fleet exercises. Early on the morning of 2 February 1939, the submarines were on their way to their assigned stations for a simulated attack against Japanese surface ships also taking part in the exercises.

I-60, proceeding on the surface at  toward her own assigned station, mistakenly entered I-63′s assigned area due to a navigation error. At around 05:00 I-60′s watch officer sighted two white lights belonging to I-63. I-60′s lookouts misidentified I-63′s lights as those of two fishing boats in close proximity to one another. I-60′s watch officer decided to pass between the supposed fishing boats, unwittingly putting I-60 on a collision course with I-63. He ordered I-60 to turn in the hope of avoiding a collision. Meanwhile, I-63′s crew called her commanding officer to her bridge, which he reached in time to see that I-60 was about to ram his submarine. He issued a command for I-63 to go to all ahead full and ordered her crew to close all watertight doors.

By the time the two submarines sighted each other, it was too late to avoid a collision, and I-60 rammed I-63. The impact tore open I-63′s starboard ballast tank and auxiliary machinery compartment. I-60, which had suffered a crushed bow buoyancy tank, rescued I-63′s commanding officer and six other crewmen. They were  only survivors.

As the result of the post-accident investigation, a court of inquiry found that I-60′s navigation error had contributed to the accident and that I-60 had unsatisfactory lookout procedures and inadequate management of her watch officers. Although off the bridge and below at the time of the collision, I-60′s commanding officer took full responsibility for the accident. After a trial by court-martial, he was suspended from duty, and his later promotion from lieutenant commander to commander was delayed.

Disposal
Pending salvage, I-63 was reassigned for administrative purposes to the Fourth Reserve in the Sasebo Naval District, effective on the date she sank. Her wreck was salvaged in January 1940 and scrapped in Kure. She was stricken from the Navy list on 1 June 1940.

Notes

References
 

1927 ships
Ships built by Sasebo Naval Arsenal
Kaidai-class submarines
Maritime incidents in 1939
Submarines sunk in collisions
Maritime incidents in Japan
Japanese submarine accidents